The Women's 100 metres T47 event at the 2016 Summer Paralympics took place at the Rio Olympic Stadium on 10 and 11 September. It featured 13 athletes from 10 countries.

The event incorporated athletes from classifications T45, T46 and T47.

Heats
In the heats, the first three in each race, and the two fastest losers overall qualify for the final.

Heat 1

Heat 2

Final

References

Athletics at the 2016 Summer Paralympics
2016 in women's athletics